The Roman Catholic Diocese of Dindigul is a diocese located in the city of Dindigul in the Ecclesiastical province of Madurai in India.

History
 10 November 2003: Established as Diocese of Dindigul from the Metropolitan Archdiocese of Madurai and Diocese of Tiruchirapalli

Leadership
 Bishops of Dindigul (Latin Rite)
 Bishop Thomas Paulsamy (11 April 2016 – Present)
 Bishop Antony Pappusamy (10 November 2003 – 26 July 2014)

Saints and causes for canonisation
 Servant of God Augustine Pereira

References

External links
 GCatholic.org
 Catholic Hierarchy

Roman Catholic dioceses in India
Christian organizations established in 2003
Roman Catholic dioceses and prelatures established in the 21st century
Christianity in Tamil Nadu